Khosrow's Palace (Persian: کاخ خسرو) is the remains of a Sassanian palace in Qasr-e Shirin, Iran.The Palace was built on the order of Khosrow II for his Christian wife, Shirin.

It was listed among the national heritage sites of Iran with the number 32 on 16 September 1931.

References 

Tourist attractions in Kermanshah Province
Palaces in Iran